Garfield is a census-designated place in Doña Ana County, New Mexico, United States. Its population was 137 at the time of the 2010 census. Garfield has a post office with ZIP code 87936, which opened on September 19, 1896. The community is located on New Mexico State Road 187 south of Exit 51 of Interstate 25.

Geography

Demographics

Education
Garfield is within Hatch Valley Public Schools. The district operates Garfield Elementary School.

References

Census-designated places in New Mexico
Census-designated places in Doña Ana County, New Mexico